Iberia, in its most common meaning, refers to the Iberian Peninsula in southwestern Europe. In history, it was also used to refer to anything pertaining to the former Kingdom of Iberia, an exonym for the Georgian kingdom of Kartli.

Iberia may also refer to:

Historical monarchies and regions

 Kingdom of Iberia (c. 302 BC–580 AD), an ancient Georgian kingdom
 Christianization of Iberia (c. 319), process of christianization of the Georgian kingdom
 Sasanian Iberia (523–626/627 AD), the eastern parts of Caucasian Georgia under direct Sasanian rule
 Principality of Iberia (580-880 AD), in early medieval Caucasian Georgia
 Kingdom of the Iberians (888-1008), a Georgian monarchy concentrated on historical lands of Tao and Klarjeti 
 Iberia, Byzantine Empire (c. 1000-1074 AD), an administrative and military unit of the Byzantine Empire carved out of several Georgian lands

Modern places
 Iberia District, Tahuamanu Province, Peru
 Iberia, Minnesota, United States, an unincorporated community
 Iberia, Missouri, United States, a city
 Iberia, Ohio, United States, a census-designated place
 Iberia Parish, Louisiana, United States

Arts and entertainment
 Iberia (book), an illustrated travel book by James Michener
 Iberia (Albéniz), a piano suite by Isaac Albéniz
 Ibéria, the second of three sections of Images pour orchestre, a musical composition by Claude Debussy

Sports
 Deportes Iberia, a Chilean football club based in Los Ángeles
 Iberia SC, a former Spanish football club based in Zaragoza, Aragon

Transportation
 Iberia (airline), the largest Spanish airline
 SS Iberia, several ships
 Iberia Airport, Iberia District, Peru

See also
 IberiaBank, an American financial holding company originating in New Iberia, Louisiana, United States (1887)
  
 Iberian (disambiguation)